Let Her Cry may refer to:

"Let Her Cry" (song), a 1994 song by Hootie & the Blowfish
Let Her Cry (film), a 2016 Sri Lankan film